The following is a partial list of the "A" codes for Medical Subject Headings (MeSH), as defined by the United States National Library of Medicine (NLM).

This list continues the information at List of MeSH codes (A05). Codes following these are found at List of MeSH codes (A07). For other MeSH codes, see List of MeSH codes.

The source for this content is the set of 2006 MeSH Trees from the NLM.

– endocrine system

– chromaffin system
  – chromaffin cells
  – chromaffin granules
  – enterochromaffin cells
  – enterochromaffin-like cells
  – para-aortic bodies
  – paraganglia, chromaffin

– enteroendocrine cells
  – enterochromaffin cells
  – enterochromaffin-like cells
  – gastrin-secreting cells
  – glucagon-secreting cells
  – insulin-secreting cells
  – pancreatic polypeptide-secreting cells
  – somatostatin-secreting cells

– endocrine glands
  – adrenal glands
  – adrenal cortex
  – zona fasciculata
  – zona glomerulosa
  – zona reticularis
  – adrenal medulla
  – gonads
  – ovary
  – corpus luteum
  – luteal cells
  – ovarian follicle
  – follicular fluid
  – granulosa cells
  – theca cells
  – testis
  – leydig cells
  – islets of langerhans
  – glucagon-secreting cells
  – insulin-secreting cells
  – pancreatic polypeptide-secreting cells
  – somatostatin-secreting cells
  – parathyroid glands
  – pineal gland
  – pituitary-adrenal system
  – pituitary gland
  – pituitary gland, anterior
  – pituitary gland, posterior
  – thyroid gland

– neurosecretory systems
  – hypothalamo-hypophyseal system
  – median eminence
  – pituitary gland
  – pituitary gland, anterior
  – pituitary gland, posterior
  – pineal gland

The list continues at List of MeSH codes (A07).

A06